Raghunath Singh Bahadur (28 November 1929 – 1982) was a "Maharawal of Jaisalmer" and Lok Sabha in Member of Parliament elected independent candidate 1957 for Barmer constituency Rajasthan.

References

1929 births
1982 deaths
Lok Sabha members from Rajasthan
People from Jaisalmer district
Mayo College alumni
India MPs 1957–1962
People from Barmer, Rajasthan